Dinn is an English and Irish surname, of Gaelic or Norman origin. The name has three possible origins, a nickname for Dennis (Dinis), another origin is an Irish Byname meaning Brown or Dark coloured, another origin is Anglo-Norman  meaning an inhabitance of the Norman town Dives-sur-Mer. The surname is well known in the United States and Canada. The surname is very common in Massachusetts and Indiana  in the United States, and in Canada the surname is very common in Newfoundland and Labrador.

Notable people with the surname
 Charles Dinn, roller-coaster designer and founder of the Dinn Corporation
 Denise Dinn-Larrick, founder of roller coaster manufacturing firm Custom Coasters International
 Jerome Dinn (b. 1940), Canadian politician
 John Dinn, Canadian politician
 Noel Dinn, founder of Canadian band Figgy Duff

References

External links
 https://forebears.co.uk/surnames/dinn

Surnames of Irish origin
Surnames of English origin